James Gordon (c.1758–1822) was a British barrister, politician and plantation owner on Antigua and St Vincent.

Life
He was the son of James Brebner and Anne Lavington (or Mary), born on Antigua. His father adopted the surname Gordon in 1768. His sister Mary married Sir William Abdy, 6th Baronet.

Gordon entered St John's College, Cambridge in 1775, at age 17; he had been educated at Winchester College, or possibly Harrow School. He entered Lincoln's Inn also in 1775, and was called to the bar there in 1780.

James Gordon committed suicide at his London home on Hill Street, Mayfair, on 18 February 1822.

Moor Place

Gordon inherited Moor Place at Much Hadham, Hertfordshire, when his father died in 1807; it was built by Robert Mitchell of Aberdeen for his father in 1777–9. The Moor Place estate had belonged to his great-uncle James Gordon (died 1768, of Antigua and Moor Place, 9th of Knockespock), whose will had caused his father to change name to James Brebner Gordon.

Plantations
Gordon left extensive slave-run plantations to his son James Adam, in Antigua, St Vincent and St Kitts, and around 500 enslaved people.

Family
Gordon married in 1789 Harriet or Harriot Whitbread, daughter of Samuel Whitbread (1720–1796) the brewer and politician. She inherited Stocks House in Hertfordshire, from her maternal grandfather William Hayton of Ivinghoe.

Notes

1822 deaths
Year of birth uncertain
Suicides in Westminster
Members of the Parliament of Great Britain for English constituencies
Members of the Parliament of Great Britain for Truro
British MPs 1784–1790
British MPs 1790–1796
Members of the Parliament of the United Kingdom for English constituencies
UK MPs 1807–1812